is a junction passenger railway station in the city of  Kamagaya, Chiba Prefecture, Japan, operated jointly by the third sector Hokusō Railway and the private railway operators Keisei Electric Railway, Shin-Keisei Electric Railway and the Tōbu Railway.

Lines
Shin-Kamagaya Station is served by the following lines.
Hokusō Railway
Hokusō Line
Keisei Electric Railway
Narita Sky Access Line
Shin-Keisei Electric Railway
Shin-Keisei Line
Tobu Railway
Tobu Urban Park Line

Station Layout

Shin-Keisei Platforms
The Shin-Keisei section consists of a single island platform serving two tracks.

Hokusō and Keisei Platforms

The Hokusō and Keisei Electric Railway section consists of two elevated island platforms serving two tracks.

Tōbu Platforms
The Tobu section consists of two opposite side platforms serving two tracks.

History
The station opened on 31 March 1991, served initially by the Hokuso Railway. The Shin-Keisei station opened on 8 July 1992, and the Tōbu Railway station (originally the Tōbu Noda Line) opened on 25 November 1999.

Passenger statistics
In fiscal 2017, the Hokusō Railway portion of the station was used by an average of 22,184 passengers daily. The Keisei portion of the station was used by 4,476 passengers and the Shin-Keisei portion of the station was used by 34,156 passengers. The Tōbu Railway portion of the station was used by 40,389 passengers daily.

See also
 List of railway stations in Japan

References

External links

 Hokuso Railway station information 
 Shin-Keisei Railway station information 
 Tobu Railway station information 

Railway stations in Chiba Prefecture
Railway stations in Japan opened in 1991
Kamagaya